Mariana Francesca Mazzucato (born June 16, 1968) is an economist with dual Italian–American citizenship. She is a professor in the Economics of Innovation and Public Value at University College London and founding director of the UCL Institute for Innovation and Public Purpose (IIPP). She is best known for her work on dynamics of technological change, the role of the public sector in innovation, and the concept of value in economics. The New Republic have called her one of the "most important thinkers about innovation".

Mazzucato has published widely in the fields of innovation economics, value theory and political economy and is the author of various books, including: The Entrepreneurial State: Debunking Public vs. Private Sector Myths, The Value of Everything: Making and Taking in the Global Economy, and Mission Economy: A Moonshot Guide to Changing Capitalism.

Her career has emphasised translating economic ideas into policy and she holds numerous high-level policy roles. Currently, she is chair of the World Health Organization's Council on the Economics of Health for All, a member of the Scottish Government's Council of Economic Advisers, the South African President's Economic Advisory Council, and the United Nations' High-Level Advisory Board on Economic and Social Affairs.

In 2021, in recognition of her contributions to economic theory and policy, Mazzucato received the Grande Ufficiale Ordine al Merito della Repubblica Italiana from the Italian President, Italy's highest civilian honour.

Early life and education 
Mazzucato was born in Rome, Italy to parents Ernesto Mazzucato, a physicist, and Alessandra Mazzucato, who are both Italian. In 1972, the family moved to Princeton, New Jersey, with their three young children, Valentina, Mariana and Jacopo, after Ernesto accepted a position at Princeton University's Plasma Physics Laboratory. Mazzucato spent most of her early life in the US before returning to Europe.

In 1986, Mazzucato graduated from Princeton High School. In 1990, Mazzucato received a B.A. in history and international relations from Tufts University. In 1994, Mazzucato received a M.A. in economics from the New School for Social Research before earning her PhD in Economics at the New School in 1999. Her dissertation was titled Four Essays on Evolutionary Market Share Dynamics: A Computational Approach. Her thesis advisors were Willi Semmler, Lance Taylor, Duncan K. Foley, and Charles Tilly.

Career

Academic 
From 1995 to 1997, Mazzucato was an adjunct professor of economics at New York University. She taught at the University of Denver between 1997 and 1999. Between 1998 and 1999 she was a post-doctoral Marie Curie Research Fellow at the London Business School where she worked closely with Paul Geroski.

She joined The Open University in 1999 as a lecturer, and became a full professor in 2005. She founded their Innovation, Knowledge and Development research centre. From 2008 to 2010 she was a visiting professor at Bocconi University. In 2014, she was a distinguished visiting professor at the University of Technology Sydney. Between 2011 and 2017, she was the RM Phillips Chair in the Economics of Innovation at the University of Sussex before moving to University College London in 2017 to become Professor in the Economics of Innovation and Public Value and found their Institute for Innovation and Public Purpose (IIPP).

Economic advisory 
Mazzucato has been active in advising governments on innovation and growth policies. Between 2015 and 2019, she was a member of the international advisory panel of Sitra, the Finnish Innovation Fund. In 2018, she was co-chair of the Commission for Mission Oriented Innovation and Industrial Strategy informing the Government of the United Kingdom's Industrial Strategy. In 2019, South African President Cyril Ramaphosa appointed Mazzucato to be a member of his Economic Advisory Council, a position where she remains active in providing recommendations for building sustainable and inclusive development. Since 2020, she has been a member of the Innovation Expert Group at the United Kingdom Department of Business, Energy and Industrial Strategy and a member international advisory panel of Vinnova, Sweden's innovation agency. In 2020, Italian Prime Minister Giuseppe Conte appointed Mazzucato as a Special Advisor on economic policy and made her Italy's representative economist on the G7 Panel on Economic Resilience which advised the G7 leaders at the 2021 G7 Summit in Cornwall, UK. She is currently a member of the Council of Economic Advisors to the Scottish Government, a role she has held since 2015. She worked closely with the Scottish Government and First Minister in establishing the Scottish National Investment Bank in 2018. Between 2015 and 2016, she served on the British Labour Party's Economic Advisory Committee providing advice to the Shadow Cabinet.

As well as national governments, Mazzucato has also served as an economic advisor to international institutions, including the World Economic Forum, the European Commission, the World Health Organization, the OECD, and the United Nations Department of Economic and Social Affairs. She was a member of the European Commission's Task Force on Public Sector Innovation and their expert group on Innovation for Growth (RISE). From 2018-2019, she was Special Advisor to the European Commission's Commissioner for Research, Science and Innovation, Carlos Moedas. In 2020, Tedros Adhanom Ghebreyesus, the Director-General of the World Health Organization, appointed Mazzucato as Chair of the World Health Organization's Council on the Economics of Health for All. Currently, she also serves on the United Nation's High-Level Advisory Board on Economic and Social Affairs, the United Nation's Sustainable Development Solutions Network Leadership Council, the United Nation's Committee for Development Policy and the Commission for Universal Health convened by Chatham House.

In 2016, Mazzucato became the first woman to give the Raúl Prebisch Lecture organised by the United Nations Economic Commission for Latin America and the Caribbean in Santiago, Chile.

Mazzucato has authored a number of policy reports, including Mission-Oriented Research & Innovation in the European Union, which directly informed the EU's Horizon Europe research and innovation programme, and a report in 2016 commissioned by the Brazilian Ministry for Science, Technology & Innovation on Brazil's innovation policy.

Research

Innovation 
Mazzucato's research has addressed the relationship between innovation, government policy, financial markets and economic growth, spanning the company, industry and national level. Much of her work has been inspired by the Schumpeterian framework of evolutionary economics. Her early research was on the origin and evolution of persistent differences between firms and the implications of this for industry life-cycles and differences in sector structure.
Her empirical studies have focused on the automobile, PC, biotech and pharma industries.

A major area of contribution has been the interaction between financial markets in technological change addressing both the positive and negative influences of financial actors on innovation. Earlier work had found that stock price volatility tends to be highest, at the firm and industry level, when technological innovation is the most radical. From 2009-2012, she was the Director of the FINNOV: Finance, Innovation & Growth research project, funded by the European Commission. Recent research of Mazzucato has highlighted the heterogeneity in the type of corporate finance offered by different institutional actors and the failure of private actors to provide sufficient "patient finance" that takes long term risk in areas such as renewable energy.

In 2013, Mazzucato published her most famous work, The Entrepreneurial State. The book pointed to the key role that government actors has played in driving radical innovations in their early stages, especially in the US. It outlined a number of case studies across different sectors - including biotech, pharmaceuticals and clean technology - to show that the high-risk investments have been made by the state before the private sector gets involved. In a well known chapter examining the iPhone, she outlines how the technologies that make it 'smart' – the internet, GPS, its touchscreen display and the voice-activated Siri – were all government-funded. She argues in the book that public funds are laying the groundwork for the green revolution in a similar way to biotech and nanotech.

Value creation and market shaping 
Later work has built on the conclusion of The Entrepreneurial State that the socialisation of risks for radical innovation requires rethinking how the rewards are privatised with the aim of producing more inclusive growth. In a joint 2013 article with William Lazonick, The Risk-Reward Nexus: Who takes the risks? Who gets the rewards?, she further described the tension between how value is created and how value is extracted in modern-day capitalism, producing a narrowing distribution of the rewards.

In 2018, Mazzucato published a second major book, The Value of Everything: making and taking in the global economy, which addressed the fundamental concept of value in economic theory. It traced the long and diverse history of theories of economic value and argued against the circular reasoning that emerged with Neoclassical economics where financial reward was seen as commensurate with creating real value. The book argues that some private companies act as rent-seekers rather than creating value themselves, and that current legislation encourages that type of behaviour.

Mazzucato has developed a critique of market failure theory and argued for a concept that better captures the value that the state can create. This has led her to propose the state's role in the economy as one of creating and shaping new markets, especially in a "mission-oriented" way that addresses key societal challenges. Her third major book, Mission Economy: A Moonshot Guide to Changing Capitalism, summarises her arguments for improving state capabilities and re-orientating economic policy around ambitious missions with societal objectives.

Reception 
The Entrepreneurial State had a significant impact on the public debate around growth and innovation and brought a wider acceptance of the importance of the public sector's role, despite pushback from more right-wing commentators. Martin Wolf wrote in the Financial Times that The Entrepreneurial State offers "a controversial thesis" but "is basically right" and warns that the "failure to recognise the role of the government in driving innovation may well be the greatest threat to rising prosperity". The Economist also praised Mazzucato for highlighting the state's "central role in producing game-changing breakthroughs" and "contribution to the success of technology-based businesses", although it argued that in general she was "too hard on business". The book was listed in the Financial Times Selection of Books of the Year in 2013 and won her the New Statesman/SPERI Prize in Political Economy in 2014.

The Value of Everything was also well received by reviewers and was shortlisted for that the 2018 Financial Times and McKinsey Business Book of the Year prize. The book was read by Pope Francis who commented "I believe [her vision] can help to think about the future".

Mission Economy received a more mixed reception and some commentators and fellow economists have been sceptical of Mazzucato's idealism on big government intervention. Diane Coyle argued that Mazzucato underplayed the risk of government failure and ignored potential issues with the incentives which govern public actors. John Kay wrote in the Financial Times that "Mission Economy proposals would lead to powerful governments driving and co-ordinated every stage of innovation to solve issues from cancer to climate change", but argues that such projects tend to be failures because political direction of innovation would have led to absence of objective feedback, whereas efficient progress tends to require very competitive markets with incremental innovation and power decentralized to individual entrepreneurs with their independent visions. Other economists have been more supportive of Mazzucato's faith in public policy and praised the application of the Apollo 11 archetype to modern challenges. Jayati Ghosh, writing for Nature, wrote that Mission Economy is a "timely and optimistic vision" of solving major problems through directed private and public investment which may  seem simple and obvious, but implies revolutionising the role for governments.

Criticism 
After being featured in a Financial Times article about how management consultants lack expertise in the areas they advise in, several prominent venture capital investors commented that such an accusation is akin to "the pot calling the kettle black." Although acknowledging that her accusation may be true, Multiple Capital founder Michael Jackson noted that "a person who has innovated nothing, who has never founded a company, who has never built a business, is in no position to advise governments or the European Union on innovation policy."

Personal life 
Mazzucato is married to Carlo Cresto-Dina, an Italian film producer, and they have four children.

Media 
Mazzucato writes op-eds for various national newspapers, including The Guardian, Financial Times, and The New York Times, and is a regular contributor of commentaries to Project Syndicate. Mazzucato frequently appears on news and current affairs programmes and gives keynote talks at conferences. These include a number of highly viewed TED talks and a recent talk on her book Mission Economy for Talks at Google.

Awards 

The 2018 Leontief Prize for Advancing the Frontiers of Economic Thought for her research focused on how governments foster innovation.
The 2019 All European Academies Madame de Staël Prize for Cultural Values, honouring her contributions on the public sector role in fostering innovation.
The 2020 John von Neumann Award, given annually by Rajk College to a social sciences scholar whose works have had substantial influence over a long period of time on the studies and intellectual activity of the students of the college.
In 2021, she received the Grande Ufficiale Ordine al Merito della Repubblica Italiana, the highest civilian honour of the Italian state, in recognition of her contributions to economic theory and policy.
Honorary Doctorates: National University of San Martín, Argentina (2016); Hasselt University, Belgium (2017); York University, UK (2020); Simon Fraser University, Canada (2020); Universitat Oberta de Catalunya (UOC - Open University of Catalonia), Spain (2022).

Selected works and publications

Books

Selected publications

See also
 Joseph Schumpeter
 John Maynard Keynes
 Giovanni Dosi
 Christopher Freeman
 Keith Pavitt
 Paul Geroski

References

External links 
 

1968 births
Living people
Italian economists
Italian women economists
American people of Italian descent
Academics of the University of Sussex
Academics of London Business School